Reutech Radar Systems (RRS) is a subsidiary of Reunert Limited, a South African defence and aerospace technology company. The company headquartered in Stellenbosch manufactures radar and radar-related systems. It is a supplier of search and tracking systems for application in the military and paramilitary environments as well as a Movement and Surveying Radar System for open-pit mining.

Products
Products made by RRS include 3D and 2D search and surveillance radars, tracking radars, sub-systems and mining sensor systems.

References

External links 

 Reunert Limited

Radar manufacturers
Defence companies of South Africa
Technology companies of South Africa
Companies based in Stellenbosch